Lorraine McNamara (born February 18, 1999) is an American ice dancer. With her skating partner, Anton Spiridonov, she is the 2023 World University Games silver medalist and 2022 CS U.S. Classic bronze medalist.

With her former partner, Quinn Carpenter, she is the 2018 Grand Prix of Helsinki bronze medalist, a three-time silver medalist on the ISU Challenger Series, and the 2019 U.S. national pewter medalist. Earlier in their career, they became the 2016 World Junior champions, the 2015 JGP Final champions, and two-time U.S. national junior champions.

Personal life 
Lorraine McNamara was born February 18, 1999, in Washington, D.C. She has four brothers and one sister. She attended Connelly School of the Holy Child in Potomac, Maryland.

Career 
On the ice from age two and a half, McNamara began training under Elena Novak and Alexei Kiliakov at the Wheaton Ice Dance Academy as a young child. She teamed up with her first ice dancing partner when she was six and skated with him for five months.

McNamara began skating with Quinn Carpenter in 2005. They won the junior bronze medal at the 2012 U.S. Championships, but McNamara was too young to be sent to the 2012 World Junior Championships.

2012–2013 season 
McNamara/Carpenter became age-eligible for junior internationals. In August 2012, they finished sixth in their Junior Grand Prix (JGP) debut in Courchevel, France. They placed fourth the following month at their second JGP assignment in Istanbul, Turkey. After winning the junior bronze medal at the U.S. Championships, McNamara/Carpenter were assigned to the World Junior Championships in Milan. They placed 8th in the short dance, 11th in the free dance, and 9th overall in Italy.

2013–2014 season 
McNamara/Carpenter won their first international medals during the 2013–14 JGP series, taking silver in Riga, Latvia, and then gold in Minsk, Belarus. Their results qualified them to the JGP Final in Fukuoka, Japan, where they won the bronze medal. The duo won the junior silver medal at the 2014 U.S. Championships and finished fourth at the 2014 World Junior Championships in Sofia, Bulgaria, after placing third in the short dance and fifth in the free dance.

2014–2015 season 
In the 2014–15 JGP series, McNamara/Carpenter won bronze in Ostrava, Czech Republic, and silver in Dresden, Germany, finishing as second alternates for the JGP Final. In January 2015, they won the junior titles at the Toruń Cup and then at the 2015 U.S. National Championships. In March, they were awarded the silver medal at the 2015 World Junior Championships in Tallinn, Estonia. Third in both segments, they finished second overall to Russia's Anna Yanovskaya / Sergey Mozgov by a margin of 9.09 points and ahead of Ukraine's Oleksandra Nazarova / Maxim Nikitin by 0.82.

2015–2016 season 
McNamara/Carpenter won gold at both of their 2015–16 JGP assignments, in Colorado Springs, Colorado, and Toruń, Poland. In December 2015, they were awarded gold at the 2015–16 JGP Final, outscoring silver medalists Alla Loboda / Pavel Drozd by over eight points. In January 2016, they won their second national junior title, finishing ahead of Rachel Parsons / Michael Parsons by 4.58 points. In March, they competed at the World Junior Championships in Debrecen, Hungary. Ranked second in the short dance and first in the free dance, McNamara/Carpenter won the gold medal by a margin of 0.91 over the Parsons.

2016–2017 season 
In their final season on the junior level, McNamara/Carpenter won gold in both of their 2016-17 JGP assignments in Ljubljana, Slovenia and Ostrava, Czech Republic. They finished third at the 2016-17 Junior Grand Prix Final. They also finished third at the 2017 U.S. National Championships.

Competing in what would be their final Junior World Championships, they placed seventh in the short dance after receiving only a Level 1 on their step sequence. Carpenter had trouble with her twizzles in the free dance, placing them sixth in that segment and remaining in seventh place overall.

2017–2018 season 
Making their senior international debut, McNamara/Carpenter won the Lake Placid Ice Dance International.  Initially assigned to two Challenger series events, they placed fifth at the 2017 CS Autumn Classic International and eighth at the 2017 CS Finlandia Trophy.  They then made their Grand Prix debut, placing fifth at the 2017 Cup of China. Reflecting on the transition to the senior ranks, Carpenter remarked, "we knew we didn't have anything to lose, so we threw out our very best. We will use the experience of getting here and build off of it."  Following the Grand Prix, they competed at a third Challenger and won the silver medal at the 2017 CS Warsaw Cup.

Competing as seniors domestically, they placed sixth at the 2018 U.S. Championships.  As the top three American teams were assigned to the Olympic team, McNamara/Carpenter were sent to the 2018 Four Continents Championships in Taipei.  McNamara/Carpenter placed fourth in Taipei, of which McNamara said, "I think it went exactly the way we wanted, two strong, clean skates. I think it’s a good debut for us."

2018–2019 season 
In their second senior season, McNamara/Carpenter began by repeating as champions at Lake Placid Ice Dance International.  After winning the silver medal at their first Challenger, the 2018 CS Ondrej Nepela Trophy, they placed fourth at the 2018 Skate America, narrowly missing the podium behind Tiffany Zahorski / Jonathan Guerreiro after coming third in the free dance.  At their second Grand Prix event of the season, they won the bronze medal at the 2018 Grand Prix of Helsinki despite two extended lift deductions in the free dance.  McNamara called their first Grand Prix medal "something to be proud of." Afterward, they competed a second Challenger, the 2018 CS Inge Solar Memorial, where they again won the silver medal.

At their final event of the season, the 2019 U.S. Championships, McNamara/Carpenter placed fourth, earning the domestic pewter medal.

2019–2020 season 
Beginning the season again at the Lake Placid Ice Dance International, McNamara/Carpenter won the bronze medal.  On the Challenger series, they won bronze at the 2019 CS Ondrej Nepela Memorial.  Subsequently, an injury compelled them to withdraw from their first Grand Prix, the 2019 Internationaux de France.  They were able to compete at their second Grand Prix, placing ninth at the 2019 NHK Trophy.

McNamara/Carpenter placed sixth at the 2020 U.S. Championships. This proved to be their final competitive appearance, as Carpenter announced his retirement from ice dance on April 16, 2020.  McNamara said she would seek to continue skating with a new partner.

2020–2021 season 
The onset of the COVID-19 pandemic greatly complicated McNamara's search for a new partner, given the restrictions on both travel and the use of training facilities. Upon seeking to arrange a rink tryout with Anton Spiridonov in June of 2020, she would later note that "phone calls needed to be made so it would be open just for us, and we needed to enter through the back door." On July 3, the two announced that they had formed a partnership.  

McNamara/Spiridonov were assigned to make their Grand Prix debut at the 2020 Skate America, attended primarily by American skaters due to travel restrictions caused by the COVID-19 pandemic.  They finished in sixth place.  Making their debut at the U.S. national championships later that season, they were sixth as well there.

2021–2022 season 
McNamara/Spiridonov began the season at two American-based international competitions, the Lake Placid Ice Dance International and the 2021 U.S. Classic, finishing seventh and fifth, respectively. Making their debut on the Challenger series, they were tenth at the 2021 CS Cup of Austria.

At their second U.S. Championships, McNamara/Spiridonov finished in ninth.

2022–2023 season 
McNamara/Spiridonov entered their third season together with the personal goal of reaching the four-team podium at the national championships. After winning gold at the Ice Dance International, the team appeared at two Challenger events, winning the bronze at the 2022 CS U.S. Classic before coming fifth at the 2022 CS Nebelhorn Trophy. They also appeared at the Santa Claus Cup, winning a bronze medal.

In advance of the national championships, McNamara/Spiridonov were named to the American team for the 2023 Winter World University Games, held that year in Lake Placid. They won the rhythm dance, but in the free dance the French team Dupayage/Nabais overtook them, and McNamara/Spiridonov won the silver medal. They finished sixth at the 2023 U.S. Championships.

Programs

With Spiridonov

With Carpenter

Competitive highlights 
GP: Grand Prix; CS: Challenger Series; JGP: Junior Grand Prix

With Spiridonov

With Carpenter

2012–2013 to 2019–2020

2006–2007 to 2011–2012

Notes

References

External links 

 
 
 Lorraine McNamara / Quinn Carpenter at IceNetwork.com

1999 births
American female ice dancers
Living people
Figure skaters from Washington, D.C.
People from Germantown, Maryland
Sportspeople from Maryland
Dancers from Washington, D.C.
Dancers from Maryland
World Junior Figure Skating Championships medalists
21st-century American women
Competitors at the 2023 Winter World University Games
Medalists at the 2023 Winter World University Games
Universiade medalists in figure skating
Universiade silver medalists for the United States